Operation Titanic is a Nancy Drew and Hardy Boys Supermystery crossover novel. It was published in 1998.

Plot summary
Nancy and Bess arrive on a freighter that is on a mission: to raise the Titanic from the ocean depths! They then discover a plot threatening the ship that involves a CIA double agent. 

Meanwhile, the Hardy Boys go undercover as journalists; they arrive on the ship by helicopter, planning to undercover a terrorist in disguise and frustrate his evil plans.

References

External links
Operation Titanic at Fantastic Fiction
Supermystery series books

Supermystery
1998 American novels
1998 children's books
Novels about RMS Titanic
Novels set on ships